William L. Whitehurst Field  is a county-owned, public-use airport located four nautical miles (7 km) southwest of the central business district of Bolivar, a city in Hardeman County, Tennessee, United States.

Facilities and aircraft 
It has one runway designated 1/19 with a 5,005 by 75 ft (1,526 by 23 m) asphalt surface. For the 12-month period ending June 1, 2013, the airport had 2,444 aircraft operations, an average of 47 per week: 89% transient general aviation; 10% local general aviation; <1% military

The airport is attended from 0830 to 1700 local time and has 100LL aviation fuel and Jet-A available, plus 93 mogas (for approved aircraft).  It is included under the McKellar-Sipes Regional Airport FSS.  It has medium intensity runway lighting and PAPI on both runways.  NOTAMs are filed with McKellar-Sipes Regional Airport.

See also 
 List of airports in Tennessee

References

External links 

Airports in Tennessee
Buildings and structures in Hardeman County, Tennessee
Transportation in Hardeman County, Tennessee